You Can't Imagine How Much Fun We're Having is the fourth studio album by American hip hop duo Atmosphere. It was released through Rhymesayers Entertainment in 2005.

In 2015, it was re-released as the 10-year anniversary vinyl edition.

Reception
At Metacritic, which assigns a weighted average score out of 100 to reviews from mainstream critics, the album received an average score of 77% based on 15 reviews, indicating "generally favorable reviews".

The album was ranked by Hip Hop Golden Age as the fourth best hip hop album of 2005.

Track listing

Charts

References

External links

2005 albums
Atmosphere (music group) albums
Rhymesayers Entertainment albums